Bruce was a 1,200-ton sailing ship built in 1866 by Aitken Mansell of Glasgow, Scotland. In 1880 the Nourse Line purchased her from the British Shipowners Company.

Indian indenture ship
On 21 May 1886, Bruce carried 458 Indian indentured labourers to Fiji. In 1889 she was re-rigged as a barque.  On 3 January 1889, she carried Indian indentured labourers to Surinam in the West Indies. On 17 November 1890 she arrived in Trinidad with 507 Indian indentured labourers. There were two deaths during the voyage.  Bruce also took Indian indentured labourers to Guyana.

Coal hulk in New York Harbor
On 18 February 1891, Bruce capsized in New York Harbor, was salvaged and used for coal storage.

See also 
Indian Indenture Ships to Fiji
Indian indenture system

References 

Barques
Indian indenture ships to Fiji
Victorian-era passenger ships of the United Kingdom
Individual sailing vessels
Coal hulks
Ships built on the River Clyde
Maritime incidents in 1891
1866 ships
1866 in Scotland
Sailing ships of Scotland
History of New York City
Maritime incidents in the United States
1891 in New York City